Petra Martić was the defending champion, having won the event in 2013, but chose not to compete in 2014.

Monica Puig, Christina McHale, Urszula Radwańska and Tadeja Majerič withdrew from the tournament, giving places to all four of the losing players from the final round of qualifying.

Kristýna Plíšková won the title, defeating Zarina Diyas in the final, 6–2, 3–6, 6–4.

Seeds

Main draw

Finals

Top half

Bottom half

References

External links 
 Main draw

Aegon Trophy - Women's Singles
Aegon Trophy